William Phillips (born 9 October 1987) is an Australian sailor. Phillips competed in the 49er event at the 2020 Summer Olympics. He and his brother, Sam, managed a rank of twelfth and therefore were not in medal contention.

References

External links
 

1987 births
Living people
Australian male sailors (sport)
Olympic sailors of Australia
Sailors at the 2020 Summer Olympics – 49er
Sportsmen from Victoria (Australia)
21st-century Australian people
People from Sorrento, Victoria